Trace Sports or Trace Sport Stars is a global entertainment television channel about the lives of sports stars.

The channel can be viewed on streaming platforms such as Binge Networks.

References

External links 

 

Television stations in Mumbai
Sports television in Singapore
Television channels and stations established in 2008
2008 establishments in India
Television channels in North Macedonia